This is a complete list of American football players who have played for the Dallas Cowboys of the National Football League (NFL). It includes players who have played at least one game in the NFL regular season. The Dallas Cowboys franchise was founded in 1960 as an expansion team. The team has earned the most postseason appearances (28, which includes another league record of 54 postseason games, winning 32 of them), the most appearances in the NFC Championship Game (14), and the 2nd most Super Bowl appearances (8). The Cowboys have played for 10 NFL Championships and have won five, all five being Super Bowls.

A

Herb Adderley
Troy Aikman
Larry Allen
Lance Alworth
Bradlee Anae
Dorance Armstrong
Chidobe Awuzie
George Andrie

B

Gene Babb
John Babinecz
Robert Bailey
Dan Bailey
Jesse Baker
Jon Baker
Matt Baker
Sam Baker
Brian Baldinger
Alex Barron
Gordon Banks
Marion Barber III
Rod Barksdale
Benny Barnes
Darian Barnes
Gary Barnes
Reggie Barnes
Rodrigo Barnes
Micheal Barrow
Marv Bateman
Bill Bates
Michael Bates
Michael Batiste
Craig Baynham
Arliss Beach
Cole Beasley
Bob Belden
Jason Bell
Martellus Bennett
Darren Benson
Bob Bercich
Adam Bergen
Joe Berger
Justin Beriault
Larry Bethea
Steve Beuerlein
Erik Bickerstaff
Dick Bielski
Terry Billups
Don Bishop
Eric Bjornson
Alois Blackwell
Kelly Blackwell
Willie Blade
Ricky Blake
Drew Bledsoe
Alvin Blount
Jim Boeke
Rocky Boiman
Chris Boniol
Nate Borden
Rich Borresen
Joe Bowden
Tom Braatz
Byron Bradfute
Kerry Brady
Chris Brazzell
Bob Breunig
Alundis Brice
Greg Briggs
Lester Brinkley
Larry Brinson
Clyde Brock
Keith Brooking
Jamal Brooks
Jermaine Brooks
Kevin Brooks
Michael Brooks
Bob Brotzki
Willie Broughton
Anthony Brown
Courtney Brown
Eric Brown
Guy Brown
Larry Brown
Noah Brown
Otto Brown
Darrick Brownlow
Antonio Bryant
Dez Bryant
Chris Brymer
David Buehler
Amos Bullocks
Cornell Burbage
Jackie Burkett
Kevin Burnett
Dave Burnette
Ron Burton
Bill Butler
Quincy Butler

C

Lee Roy Caffey
Dan Campbell
Alan Campos
Billy Cannon Jr.
Barry Cantrell
Chris Canty
Warren Capone
Glenn Carano
Harold Carmichael
Bobby Carpenter
Duane Carrell
Leonardo Carson
Jon Carter
Quincy Carter
Shante Carver
Scott Case
Tony Casillas
Aveion Cason
Quinton Caver
Sal Cesario
Robert Chancey
Thornton Chandler
Taco Charlton
Louis Cheek
Randy Chevrier
Darrin Chiaverini
Ray Childress
Tashard Choice
Steve Cisowski
Morris Claiborne
Darryl Clack
Mike Clark
Monte Clark
Phil Clark
Franklin Clarke
Hayward Clay
DeVone Claybrooks
Dextor Clinkscale
Tyler Clutts
Dexter Coakley
Garry Cobb
Randall Cobb
Larry Cole
Anthony Coleman
Kenyon Coleman
Lincoln Coleman
Marcus Coleman
Ralph Coleman
Reggie Collier
Javiar Collins
Jerome Collins
Maliek Collins
Marc Colombo
Jim Colvin
Bill Conaty
Jon Condo
Fred Cone
Mike Connelly
Dan Connor
Bobby Joe Conrad
Amari Cooper
Chris Cooper
Jim Cooper
Jonathan Cooper
Reggie Cooper
Roger Cooper
Terrance Copper
Frank Cornish
Fred Cornwell
José Cortéz
Quentin Coryatt
Doug Cosbie
Vince Courville
Tyrone Crawford
Patrick Crayton
Willis Crockett
Gene Cronin
Billy Cundiff
Randall Cunningham
Richie Cunningham
Tony Curtis
Andy Cvercko

D

Tim Daniel
Dick Daniels
Woodrow Dantzler
Billy Davis
Donnie Davis
Keith Davis
Kyle Davis
Leonard Davis
Nathan Davis
Wendell Davis
Andrew Davison
Jack Del Rio
Pat Dennis
Doug Dennison
Steve DeOssie
Harold Deters
Buddy Dial
Jorge Diaz
Anthony Dickerson
Paul Dickson
John Diehl
Gennaro DiNapoli
Mike Ditka
James Dixon
Tony Dixon
Fred Doelling
Ray Donaldson
Doug Donley
Leon Donohue
Pat Donovan
Jim Doran
Karl Dorrell
Tony Dorsett
Char-ron Dorsey
Merrill Douglas
Mike Dowdle
Michael Downs
Kenny Duckett
Fred Dugan
Chris Duliban
Perry Lee Dunn
L. G. Dupree
Billy Joe Dupree
John Dutton
Mike Dwyer

E

Ricky Easmon
Ron East
Chad Eaton
Dave Edwards
Dixon Edwards
Kelvin Edwards
Mario Edwards
Jim Eidson
Ebenezer Ekuban
Abram Elam
Onzy Elam
Ezekiel Elliott
Lin Elliot
Greg Ellis
Demetric Evans
Thomas Everett

F

Jason Fabini
Mike Falls
Anthony Fasano
Ron Fellows
Jason Ferguson
Anthony Fieldings
Aaron Fields
Filip Filipović
Joe Fishback
Ray Fisher
John Fitzgerald
Harry Flaherty (tight end)
John Flannery
Cory Fleming
Ryan Flinn
Richmond Flowers
Nick Folk
Lee Folkins
Steve Folsom
Bernard Ford
Ryan Fowler
Todd Fowler
Ron Francis
Tom Franckhauser
Bill Frank
Kavon Frazier
Lance Frazier
Andy Frederick
Travis Frederick
Tyler Fredrickson
Doug Free
Ben Fricke
Byron Frisch
Toni Fritsch
Ken Frost
Bob Fry
Jean Fugett
Scott Fujita

G

Gerald McCoy
Mike Gaechter
Derrick Gainer
Scott Galbraith
Joey Galloway
Michael Gallup
Kenneth Gant
Kelvin Garmon
Jason Garrett
Judd Garrett
Walt Garrison
Everett Gay
Peter Gent
Eddie George
John Gesek
Sonny Gibbs
Aaron Gibson
Aaron Glenn
Terry Glenn
La'Roi Glover
Junior Glymph
Randall Godfrey
Kevin Gogan
John Gonzaga
Leon Gonzalez
Dwayne Goodrich
Mike Goolsby
Cornell Gowdy
Toby Gowin
Martín Gramática
Norm Granger
Orantes Grant
Jeff Grau
Alex Green
Allen Green
Cornell Green
Skyler Green
Forrest Gregg
Bill Gregory
Glynn Gregory
Bob Grottkau
Andre Gurode
Buzz Guy

H

Halvor Hagen
Charles Haley
Chris Hall
Lemanski Hall
Darren Hambrick
Troy Hambrick
Dean Hamel
Ken Hamlin
Ryan Hannam
Wayne Hansen
Darryl Hardy
Kevin Hardy
Alvin Harper
Dwayne Harris
Dave Harper
Roger Harper
Reggie Harrell
Cliff Harris
Duriel Harris
Jackie Harris
Jimmy Harris
Rod Harris
Jason Hatcher
Duane Hawthorne
Bob Hayes
Wendell Hayes
Tommy Haynes
Harold Hays
Ennis Haywood
Don Healy
Jeff Heath
George Hegamin
Mike Hegman
Don Heinrich
Dale Hellestrae
Nate Hemsley
Thomas Henderson
Steve Hendrickson
Manny Hendrix
Tim Hendrix
Chad Hennings
Anthony Henry
Drew Henson
Bill Herchman
Efren Herrera
Edward Hervey
Mark Higgs
Alonzo Highsmith
Jon Hilbert
Bill Hill
Calvin Hill
Rod Hill
Tony Hill
Tony Hill
Damon Hodge
Tommy Hodson
Gary Hogeboom
Jesse Holley
Montrae Holland
Johnny Holloway
Clayton Holmes
Issiac Holt
Dennis Homan
Mitch Hoopes
Ray Horton
John Houser
Bill Houston
Carl Howard
David Howard
Percy Howard
Ron Howard
Chuck Howley
Billy Howton
Lynn Hoyem
Oliver Hoyte
Johnny Huggins
Randy Hughes
Tyrone Hughes
Buddy Humphrey
John Hunt
Monty Hunter
Pete Hunter
Jeff Hurd
Sam Hurd
Allen Hurns
Eric Hurt
Ed Husmann
Ken Hutcherson
Chad Hutchinson
Bruce Huther
Tony Hutson

I

Michael Irvin
Joe Isbell
Raghib Ismail

J

Alcender Jackson
Tim Jackson
Willie Jackson
Bradie James
Cedric James
Vontrell Jamison
Garth Jax
Jim Jeffcoat
Patrick Jeffers
Michael Jefferson
Mike Jenkins
Ron Jenkins
Keith Jennings
Jim Jensen
John Jett
Al Johnson
Brad Johnson
Butch Johnson
Keyshawn Johnson
Mike Johnson
Mitch Johnson
Thomas Johnson
Undra Johnson
Daryl Johnston
Adam Jones
Dale Jones
E. J. Jones
Ed Jones
Felix Jones
James Jones
Jermaine Jones
Jimmie Jones
Julius Jones
Nathan Jones
Robert Jones
Lee Roy Jordan

K

Jason Kaiser
Mike Keller
Derek Kennard
Crawford Ker
Gene Killian
Keylon Kincade
Steve Kiner
Angelo King
Mike Kiselak
Jon Kitna
Syd Kitson
Dick Klein
Micah Knorr
Bernie Kosar
Kyle Kosier
Walt Kowalczyk
Kevin Kowalski
Craig Kupp
Jake Kupp
Aaron Kyle

L

L.P. Ladouceur
David LaFleur
Scott Laidlaw
Kareem Larrimore
Derrick Lassic
Babe Laufenberg
Robert Lavette
Burton Lawless
Ryan Leaf
Ronald Leary
Eddie LeBaron
ReShard Lee
Sean Lee
Matt Lehr
Tim Lester
Leon Lett
D.D. Lewis
Jourdan Lewis
Woodley Lewis
George Lilja
Bob Lilly
Kevin Lilly
Tony Liscio
Warren Livingston
J. W. Lockett
Eugene Lockhart
Obert Logan
Bob Long
Dustin Long
Clint Longley
Billy Lothridge
Reggie Love
Mike Lucky
CeeDee Lamb

M

Louis Mackey
Brett Maher
Dave Manders
Wade Manning
Brock Marion
Amos Marsh
James Marten
Harvey Martin
Jamar Martin
Kelvin Martin
Zack Martin
Carlos Martinez
Russell Maryland
Ray Mathews
Kevin Mathis
Mat McBriar
Hurvin McCormack
Gerald McCoy
Bob McCreary
Dave McDaniels
Paul McDonald
Tommy McDonald
Marques McFadden
Tony McGee
Don McIlhenny
Toddrick McIntosh
Everett McIver
Jason McKie
Jeremy McKinney
Dennis McKinnon
James McKnight
Scott McLean
Ryan McNeil
Pat McQuistan
Chuck McSwain
Dale Memmelaar
Don Meredith
John Meyers
Joey Mickey
Hugh Millen
Anthony Miller
Jim Miller
Ernie Mills
Dwayne Missouri
Aaron Mitchell
Johnny Mitchell
Singor Mobley
Dickey Moegle
Jim Molinaro
Mike Montgomery
Matt Moore
Jim Mooty
Dennis Morgan
Quincy Morgan
Alfred Morris
Craig Morton
Lee Murchison
DeMarco Murray
Eddie Murray
Adrian Murrell
Greg Myers
Michael Myers
Godfrey Myles
Tom Myslinski

N

Ralph Neely
Ryan Neufeld
Robert Newhouse
Terence Newman
Timmy Newsome
Nate Newton
Dat Nguyen
John Niland
John Nix
Brandon Noble
Dick Nolan
Ben Noll
Danny Noonan
Pettis Norman
Jerry Norton
Ken Norton
Jay Novacek
Ed Nutting
Blaine Nye

O

Eric Ogbogu
Jeff Ogden
Kevin Ogletree
Igor Olshansky
Keith O'Neil
Paul Oswald
Bob Otto
Kyle Orton
Jerry Overton
Billy Owens
Brig Owens
Terrell Owens
Akwasi Owusu-Ansah

P

Craig Page
Solomon Page
Paul Palmer
Billy Parks
James Parrish
Tony Parrish
Jack Patera
Elvis Patterson
Drew Pearson
Preston Pearson
Rodney Peete
Steve Pelluer
Jesse Penn
George Peoples
Mac Percival
Don Perkins
Ray Perkins
Bob Perryman
Stephen Peterman
Kurt Petersen
Rob Petitti
Kirk Phillips
John Phillips
Carl Pickens
Brett Pierce
Willie Pile
Cyril Pinder
Kavika Pittman
Kurt Ploeger
Lance Poimboeuf
Lousaka Polite
Brady Poppinga
David Ponder
Garry Porterfield
Karl Powe
Jemeel Powell
Phil Pozderac
Dak Prescott
Jim Price
Peerless Price
Cory Procter
Mickey Pruitt
Jethro Pugh
Duane Putnam

Q

Mike Quinn

R
                                                                                                            Lance rentzel
                      
Tony Romo
Mel Renfro
Bill Rogers
Golden Richards

S

Jay Saldi
Brian Salonen
Jeff Sanchez
Bill Sandeman
Deion Sanders
O. J. Santiago
Broderick Sargent
Buzz Sawyer
Mike Saxon
Brian Schaefering
Orlando Scandrick
Noel Scarlett
Greg Schaum
Ray Schoenke
Chris Schultz
Jim Schwantz
Steve Scifres
Chuck Scott
Darnay Scott
Herbert Scott
Schad Scott
Lynn Scott
Victor Scott
Scott Secules
Tim Seder
Ron Sellers
Gerald Sensabaugh
Rafael Septién
Scott Shanle
Randy Shannon
Robert Shaw
Joe Shearin
Derrick Shepard
Dave Sherer
Mike Sherrard
Joe Shields
Clay Shiver
Les Shy
Cleo Simmons
Dave Simmons
Victor Simmons
Al Singleton
Tony Slaton
Stan Smagala
Don Smerek
Artie Smith
Darrin Smith
Daryle Smith
Donald Smith
Emmitt Smith
J. D. Smith
Jackie Smith
Jim Ray Smith
Jimmy Smith
Kevin Smith
Rod Smith
Shaun Smith
Timmy Smith
Tody Smith
Tyron Smith
Vinson Smith
Waddell Smith
Zuriel Smith
Shannon Snell
Loren Snyder
Jesse Solomon
Roland Solomon
Mike Solwold
Phillippi Sparks
Marcus Spears
Alonzo Spellman
Anthony Spencer
Sebron Spivey
Danny Spradlin
Ron Springs
Dave Stalls
Isaiah Stanback
Montavious Stanley
Roger Staubach
Markus Steele
Robert Steele
Larry Stephens
Mark Stepnoski
Curtis Stewart
Daleroy Stewart
Devin Street
Junior Siavii
Jim Stiger
Bryan Still
Tom Stincic
Clint Stoerner
Sims Stokes
Ron Stone
Cliff Stoudt
Omar Stoutmire
Otto Stowe
Les Strayhorn
Fred Strickland
Danny Stubbs
Darren Studstill
Oscar Sturgis
Andy Stynchula
Nicky Sualua
Shaun Suisham
Mike Sullivan
Russ Swan
Kevin Sweeney
Reggie Swinton

T

Don Talbert
Matt Tarullo
Junior Tautalatasi
Johnathan Taylor
Tony Taylor
George Teague
Derek Tennell
Vinny Testaverde
Anthony Thomas
Bill Thomas
Blair Thomas
Broderick Thomas
Dave Thomas
Duane Thomas
Ike Thomas
Joey Thomas
Robert Thomas
Broderick Thompson
Tyson Thompson
Andy Thorn
Bruce Thornton (CB)
Bruce Thornton (DL)
Kalen Thornton
Dennis Thurman
Kirk Timmer
Ken Tippins
Glen Titensor
Tony Tolbert
J. R. Tolver
Pat Toomay
Willie Townes
Greg Tremble
Billy Truax
Jerry Tubbs
B. J. Tucker
Jason Tucker
Ross Tucker
Torrin Tucker
Mark Tuinei
Jimmie Turner

U

Mike Ulufale
Dimitrius Underwood
Jerheme Urban

V

Matt Vanderbeek
Mike Vanderjagt
Dick Van Raaphorst
Leighton Vander Esch
Alan Veingrad
Danny Villanueva
Kurt Vollers
Dustin Vaughan

W

Mark Walen
Gary Walker
Louie Walker
Malcolm Walker
Herschel Walker
Rodney Wallace
Everson Walls
Steve Walsh
Mike Walter
Tyson Walter
Bruce Walton
Dedric Ward
DeMarcus Ware
Derek Ware
Chris Warren
John Warren
James Washington
Mark Washington
Charlie Waters
Kendell Watkins
Randy Watts
Russell Wayt
Colston Weatherington
Brandon Weeden
Claxton Welch
Norm Wells
Bryant Westbrook
James Whalen
Kenny Wheaton
Bob White
Danny White
Gerald White
Randy White
Terry White
Lucky Whitehead
A.D. Whitfield
Fred Whittingham
Ron Widby
Dave Widell
John Wilbur
Sam Wilder
Marcellus Wiley
Michael Wiley
Charlie Williams
Erik Williams
Joe Williams
John Williams
Kevin Williams
Lenny Williams
Randal Williams
Robert Williams
Roy E. Williams
Roy Williams
Sherman Williams
Stepfret Williams
Terrance Williams
Tyrone Williams (WR)
Tyrone Williams (CB)
Ken Willis
Mitch Willis
Robert Wilson
Steve Wilson
Wade Wilson
Gary Wisener
Terry Witherspoon
Jason Witten
Darren Woodson
Rolly Woolsey
Barron Wortham
Alexander Wright
Anthony Wright
Charles Wright
Rayfield Wright
Steve Wright

Y

Maury Youmans
Charley Young
Ryan Young

Z

Peppi Zellner
Luis Zendejas
Mike Zentic
Jeff Zimmerman

See also
 Dallas Cowboys Ring of Honor

References

Dallas Cowboys

players